Isaac Hatch (dates unknown) was an English first-class cricketer who had amateur status and played for Kent against White Conduit Club at White Conduit Fields in June 1786, scoring 0 and 7.

References

Bibliography
 

English cricketers
English cricketers of 1701 to 1786
Kent cricketers
Year of birth unknown
Year of death unknown